The 2011 Chicago White Sox season was the club's 112th season in Chicago and 111th in the American League. The 2011 White Sox schedule was revealed at 7:00 pm Central  Time on September 14, 2010 along with every other team in Major League Baseball.

Offseason
On December 2, 2010 the White Sox signed a new slugger Adam Dunn from the Washington Nationals for a 4yr/$56M contract. On that same day, the Sox also re-signed A. J. Pierzynski to a 2yr/$8M extension. Six days later, the Sox resigned Paul Konerko to a 3yr/$37.5M extension. With Dunn, Konerko, and Pierzynski, there is a 5% chance that the White Sox will win the 2011 World Series. On December 15, the White Sox acquired RHP Jesse Crain from the Minnesota Twins and offered a 3yr/$13M deal. On January 18, the Sox acquired RHP Philip Humber off waivers from the Oakland A's. One month prior, the A's claimed Humber from the Kansas City Royals.

In addition to acquisitions, the White Sox also traded away some players, including Scott Linebrink to Atlanta Braves on December 3, and J. J. Putz to Arizona Diamondbacks on December 7. Bobby Jenks, who was non-tendered by the White Sox, has agreed to sign with the Boston Red Sox on December 16.

Transactions
 12/03/10 – Signed free agent DH/1B Adam Dunn and resigned C A. J. Pierzynski
 12/08/10 – Resigned 1B Paul Konerko
 12/20/10 – Signed free agent RHP Jesse Crain
 01/10/11 – Signed free agent LHP Will Ohman
 01/18/11 – Claimed RHP Philip Humber off waivers from the Oakland Athletics
 01/19/11 – Signed free agent 3B Dallas McPherson
 02/03/11 – Signed free agent OF Lastings Milledge
 06/13/11 – Claimed LHP Leyson Séptimo off waivers from the Arizona Diamondbacks
 07/05/11 – Signed 1st round draft pick from 2011 MLB draft OF Keenyn Walker, assigned to Great Falls Voyagers
 07/27/11 – Traded RHP Edwin Jackson and 3B Mark Teahen to the Toronto Blue Jays for RHP Jason Frasor and RHP Zach Stewart
 09/29/11 – Received Osvaldo Martínez and Jhan Mariñez from the Florida Marlins as compensation for Ozzie Guillén, who agreed to a four-year contract to manage the Miami Marlins in 2012

Regular season

Season standings

Record vs. opponents

Detailed records and runs scored/allowed

Roster

Season summary

Composite inning summary

Opening Day lineup

Monthly summaries

April
The Sox opened the 2011 season at Cleveland with a 15–10 victory over the Indians on April 1. It was the first time since Sep 7, 2007 that the Sox won while allowing 10 or more runs. The Sox had their first 2–0 start since 2005 with an 8–3 win over Cleveland. In the third game of this series in the 4th inning, Alexei Ramírez bunted into a 3–4–6 triple play. It was the first time that the Sox hit into a triple play since 1978. The Sox went on to lose this game 7–1. On April 5 at Kansas City Royals, the Sox scored four runs in the first inning but they would not hold on to the lead. The Sox played for 12 innings until the new Royals batter Melky Cabrera hit a walk-off single to score the former Sox player Chris Getz to suffer their first walk-off loss of the season. Last season, the Sox did not suffer their first walk-off loss until July 18 at Minnesota. After the loss, Adam Dunn had his appendix removed and he'll miss five games, but he told Ozzie Guillén that he wants to play sooner. The next game against the Royals, the Sox trailed 5–0 going to the 7th inning. In the ninth inning, the Sox took the lead 7–6 by scoring four runs against the Royals closer Joakim Soria, but the Royals tied this game up in the bottom half. Then the Sox scored three runs in the 12th inning to take the victory 10–7 over the Royals. However, the Sox committed four errors in this game.

The Sox had their home opener against the Tampa Bay Rays with a 5–1 victory on April 7. Edwin Jackson struck out 13 to set his new career high and most strikeouts by the White Sox pitcher in the home opener in club history. In next game for the first eight innings, the Sox led 7–4. In the top of the ninth inning, the Sox committed two errors which led to five unearned runs including a three-run homer by Dan Johnson off of Matt Thornton. The Sox would lose the game 9–7. That was their first win of the season for Rays. In addition, in the top of the ninth inning after Johnson's home run, the Rays took their first lead of the season after going 62 consecutive innings without lead. It is now the most consecutive innings without lead of any team of all-time. The Sox would then go on and win the final two games of this series to take three out of four from the Rays with the final scores of 4–2 and 6–1. The next series against the Oakland A's, the Sox lost two out of three with the only win being a walk-off home run in 10th inning by Alexei Ramírez in Game 2. In both losses, the Sox led going into the ninth inning only to give up runs to tie the game and lose in the 10th. For the first 12 games this season, the bullpen allowed 12 runs including 6 unearned runs in the ninth inning to lead the majors. They led the majors with 6 blown saves in 7 opportunities. In the next series, the Sox got swept by the Angels at home for the first time since 2005. The Sox finished 4–6 on the homestand.

The Sox avoided a four-game sweep by beating the Rays 9–2 behind Gavin Floyd on April 22. Then the Sox were swept by Tigers at Detroit, including being scoreless twice. The Sox split the series against the Yankees at New York, including two straight plays by Brent Lillibridge off the bats of Alex Rodríguez and Robinson Canó to end the game on April 26. The Sox finished their 11-game road trip 3–8. The Sox lost the first two games of the four-game series against the Baltimore Orioles to finish April with a 10–18 record.

May
The Sox opened the month of May with a 6–4 loss to the Orioles. Then the Sox avoided getting swept by beating the Orioles 6–2. Then on May 3 against the Minnesota Twins, Francisco Liriano no-hit the White Sox. Liriano threw 123 pitches with six walks and just two strikeouts. Prior to this game, Liriano had an ERA of 9.13, which is the second highest ERA before the no-hitter since 1913. After the no-hitter, his ERA dropped to 6.61. It is the Twins first no-hitter since Eric Milton threw one on Sep 11, 1999 against the California Angels. The Sox went hitless for the first time since Aug 26, 1991 when the Royals' pitcher Bret Saberhagen threw against them. The Sox lost again 3–2 on the next day to Minnesota to have the worst record in MLB at 11–21.

Then the Sox went on to the west coast in Seattle, Los Angeles, and Oakland, finishing 6–3 in that nine-game road trip. During the road trip on May 11 at Los Angeles, Jake Peavy started the game for the first time since July 6 of last season when he tore his lat muscle, also against the Angels. He went 6 IP 7 H 4 ER 4 K in no decision as Sox defeated Angels 6–4 in 10 innings. When Peavy added to the starting rotation and Philip Humber is too good to be moved to the bullpen, the Sox used the six-man rotation. On May 15, Mark Buehrle outdueled Trevor Cahill as Sox defeated Oakland 4–3.

The Sox went back home splitting a two-game series against the Rangers and swept the two-game series over the first-place Indians, including a three-hit shutout by Jake Peavy in the first game of that series in his second start of the season. On the next night, the Sox lost the first game of the series against the Dodgers after giving up a home run to Russell Mitchell in the 9th inning by Sergio Santos which tied the game at 3. Until Mitchell's homer, Santos did not allow a run this season, he went 20 scoreless innings. Then the Dodgers scored three runs in the 10th to beat the Sox 6–4. The Game storm betts was go but his mom got a speeding ticket day before on way home from school Meanwhile, the Sox won the final two games against the Dodgers to win their first interleague series of the season.
The Sox lost two out of three at Texas. In the second game of that series on May 24, the game was in a 2:58 rain delay, but the Sox took this game 8–6 in 9 innings as the game ended at 1:27 am CT. In next series at Toronto, the Sox took the opener by a final score of 3–1 by scoring two runs in the ninth inning. In the third game of this series, the Sox tied the game up at 8 in the ninth inning. In the Sox half of the 11th inning, Brent Morel hit a lead-off double but the team did not score. In the Blue Jays' half of 14th inning with starter Gavin Floyd in relief, a leadoff hitter Corey Patterson hit a walk-off homer which ended the game with a final score of 9–8. The Sox suffered their fourth walk-off loss of the season. In the finale of that series, John Danks gave up 9 runs in 4 innings. The Sox went on to lose 13–4 and Danks was then 0–8 with a 5.25 ERA. With the only win in that four-game series coming in the opener of the series, the Sox had lost seven straight games in the finale of a four-game series when they won the opener and lost the next two dating back to the start of 2007 season. On Memorial Day, the Sox took Game 1 of the series at Boston with a final score of 7–3. In Game 2, the Sox defeated the Red Sox 10–7, as the White Sox bullpen allowed 6 runs in final two innings. The Sox finished May with a 16–13 record.

June
Continuing the series at Boston starting in May, the Sox played the finale of the series at Boston looking for a second consecutive sweep at Boston, and then they did. The White Sox defeated the Red Sox 7–4 to win their seventh straight at Fenway Park, their longest since 1958–59 when they also won seven straight. The White Sox have also won 13 of their last 15 contests against the Red Sox overall. Over the last 15 games, the White Sox have outscored the Red Sox 88–50 during that span.

On June 3, the Sox began their 10-game homestand against the Tigers. The Sox won the opener of the three-game series 6–4 but they lost the series by losing the last two with final scores of 4–2 and 7–3. Finally on June 6, John Danks outdueled Michael Pineda to take the first win of the season by beating the Mariners 3–1. Danks is the last qualified starting pitcher of the season to record a win. Philip Humber dominated again as Sox defeat Seattle 5–1. In the finale of this three-game series, Carlos Quentin hit his game-tying two-run homer to tie the game 4–4 in eighth inning. That was his second homer of the game after his solo jack in first inning. However, the Sox will lose the game 7–4 in 10 innings. In the opener of the 4-game series against Oakland, Mark Buehrle outdueled Trevor Cahill again as they defeated Oakland 9–4. Then the next game was ugly. In the ninth inning with two outs, nobody one, and 0–2 count, Sox led 5–3, Josh Willingham walked and then deteriorated. Several at-bats later, Scott Sizemore (who just acquired from Detroit couple days prior) hit his game-winning three-run double to defeat the Sox 7–5 as Sergio Santos blows his second save of the season. On next day, Danks recorded his back-to-back win after losing eight decision by beating Oakland 3–2. In that game in the eighth inning, Brent Lillibridge made his game-saving home run robbing catch off the bat of Coco Crisp with runner on first. In the finale of this series on June 12, Sox defeat Oakland 5–4 to take three out of four from Oakland and finish the homestand 6–4.

The Sox played a two-game series at Minnesota from June 15–16 because the game was postponed due to rain on June 14. The Sox were swept in a two-game series including a 1–0 loss. The Sox went to Arizona for the first time since 2003, where they take two out of three. In the opener of this series, Edwin Jackson faced Daniel Hudson who switched teams between Sox and D-backs last season. Hudson wins 4–1 over Jackson. The Sox won the final two games of this series with the final scores of 6–2 and 8–2. Even though D-backs were 2nd in NL in home runs, D-backs did not hit any home runs against the Sox in this series.

The Sox came home to play the Cubs and the Nats. The Sox lost the opener of the series to the Cubs 6–2 and won the last two by the scores of 3–2 and 4–3. The Sox allowed a home run to former Ray Carlos Peña in all three game of this series including a game-winning three-run homer in the 6th in the opener of this series. In the opener of the last season's rematch with the Nats, in the ninth inning, Mark Teahen hit a game-tying three-run homer to tie the game at 3. The Nats score a run in the tenth on Laynce Nix's solo home run. The Sox scored one in the bottom half to tie the game again. In the 12th inning, the Nats scored a run and in the bottom half, A. J. Pierzynski tied the game up yet again with a solo home run with two outs and an 0–2 count. In the 14th inning, Alexei Ramírez committed an error with led to four gifted runs for a 9–5 Sox loss. Then the Sox won the second game of this series 3–0. John Danks got injured after 1.2 IP and he would go on the 15-day disabled list with a right oblique strain. Jake Peavy would pitch for 4 innings for his 4th victory of the season. In the finale of this series, in the 7th inning with one out and one on, Paul Konerko appeared to hit a GW two-run homer but the wind kept it in the ballpark and Jerry Hairston Jr. made a catch in left field. The Sox would go on to lose 2–1 and the Sox lost the home series against the Nats even though the Sox swept the Nats at D.C. last season. Also in that game, Adam Dunn went 0–4 with four strikeouts, becoming the first big league player to strikeout 100 times this season.

The Sox would then head to Denver for the first time since 2005, taking two out of three from the Rox, including a split in extra-inning games. The Sox finished the month of June with a 14–11 record.

July
The Sox opened the month of July with a 6–4 comeback victory over the Cubs at Wrigley Field. They won the next game 1–0 by a great pitching performance by Humber and then they lost 3–1 in the finale of this series. The Sox finished the season series against the Cubs 4–2 and 11–7 in interleague play. The Sox lost two out of three from Kansas City and three out of four from Minnesota at U.S. Cellular Field before heading into the All-Star break. Both of those wins came on a walk-off. The Sox are 8–31 against Minnesota since May 21, 2009 and 1–7 against them in 2011. The Sox went on their 8-game road trip excluding a rain-out game at Cleveland. The Sox took two out of three from Detroit, lost two out of three to Royals, and swept two games at Cleveland. Then the Sox went on to their 10-game homestand with six games left in July. The Sox won the series against the Detroit again and then they lost two out of three to Boston Red Sox via the Rock Series (WLL) after the Sox swept the other Sox in Boston earlier this season. During the off day on July 27 before the series against Boston, the Sox traded away Edwin Jackson and Mark Teahen to Toronto Blue Jays for Jason Frasor and Zach Stewart. Jackson would then be traded to St. Louis Cardinals. The Sox finished the month of July with a 12–12 record with a losing home record (5–8) but a winning road record (7–4).

August
The Sox continued their 10-game homestand started in July with four games to play against the Yankees. Worst of all, the Sox got swept in a four-game series at home against the Yankees for the first time since June 1976 and first time the Sox swept in a four-game series at home by an opponent since August 2007 when the White Sox were swept by Red Sox. In a third game of this dreadful four-game series, the Sox allowed a season high 18 runs, including 13 in the first three innings. Also during the four-game series, the Sox hitters never walked.

After that dreadful series against the Yankees, the Sox went to Target Field to take on the Twins for the three-game series. In Game 2 of this series, Zach Stewart, who acquired from Toronto in Edwin Jackson deal, started this game and got his first Major League win by going 6.1 IP and 1 ER. In Game 3 of this series, Jake Peavy pitched eight shutout innings. The Sox would go on to sweep the Twins on the road for the first time since June/July 2004 by the scores of 5–3, 6–1, and 7–0. Then the Sox went to Baltimore and took three of four to even the season series against the Orioles 4–4. Then the Sox went home to play the Royals, Indians, and the first place Rangers. The Sox took two of three from the Royals, lost two of three from the Indians, and won two of three from the Rangers, all via rock series. The Sox went to the west coast to take on the Angels and the Mariners. The Sox were swept in a two-game series against the Halos and the Sox swept the Mariners in a three-game weekend series. In the finale of that series, Dayán Viciedo called up from Triple-A Charlotte to play right field as Carlos Quentin went to the 15-day DL. In his second at-bat, Viciedo hit his three-run homer to make it 3–0 Sox. A couple innings later, Tyler Flowers, who is playing for A. J. Pierzynski who is also on the 15-day DL, hit his first career grand slam and his second homer of his career. It is also the first grand slam the Sox have hit this season. The Sox would go on to win this game 9–3 to complete the sweep. Since the start of the 2008 season, the Sox have won 23 of the last 25 games when they hit grand slam(s).

The Sox concluded the month by taking two out of three from the struggling Twins. The Sox finished the month of August with a 16–12 record with a losing home record (7–9) but a winning road record (9–3).

September
The Sox began the month by getting swept in the Motor City by Tigers, which increase the Sox deficit of Detroit from 5½ to 8½ games. In that series, the Sox were outscored 35–11 in a three-game series including an 18–2 loss in the second game. The Sox went to Minnesota and won their first three games of a four-game series and then lost the last game that would otherwise been their first four-game sweep in Minnesota ever. In the second game of this series (second game of a doubleheader), rookie Zach Stewart flirted with perfecto as he retired the first 21 Twin batters he faced before giving up a double to Danny Valencia. Stewart would then go on to retire six straight to end the game with a one-hitter.

The Sox came back to U.S. Cellular Field to take on the Indians in a four-game set. The Sox split the series. On the morning of September 10, Jake Peavy decided to shut down for the rest of the season so he'll get more time to relax his lat muscles recovered from surgery and make him stronger for next season. Peavy finished the season with a 4.92 ERA in 18 starts and 1 relief appearance. Later on that day in the third game of a four-game set against the Indians, Alex Ríos hit a walk-off grand slam in the 10th inning for a 7–3 Sox victory. Then the Sox got ugly, they were swept by Detroit in a three-game series at home in September for the second consecutive year. In the finale of that series, the Sox led 5–2 going to the 9th inning and then Sergio Santos suffered his 6th blown save of the season by giving up two home runs and preventing rookie Dylan Axelrod from picking up his first major league win. The Sox would lose in the 10th inning 6–5. So the playoff chances for the Sox is nil as they fall to 13½ games behind Detroit.

The Sox played their final road trip of the season: they lost three out of four against the Royals and won two out of four against the Indians. The Sox played their final homestand of the season: the Sox lost two out of three against the Royals and won two out of three against the Blue Jays. In the opener of that series against the Blue Jays, Dylan Axelrod picked up his first major league win, going 6 IP, 3 H, 0 ER, 2 BB, 6 K in a 4–3 Sox victory. After the opener against the Blue Jays, the manager Ozzie Guillén called it quits as the White Sox skipper and he will manage the Miami Marlins under his four-year contract starting next season. The pitching coach Don Cooper took over as manager for the final two games of the season. The Sox would go on to finish the month of September with an 11–17 record and a third-place finish at 79–83 overall, suffering their losing season in third consecutive odd-numbered years. With a road record of 43–38, it is the first team in franchise history to end the season with a losing overall record but a winning road record.

Game log

|- align="center" bgcolor="bbffbb"
| 1 || April 1 || @ Indians || 15–10 || Buehrle (1–0) || Carmona (0–1) || || 3:09 || 41,721 || 1–0 || +½ || box
|- align="center" bgcolor="bbffbb"
| 2 || April 2 || @ Indians || 8–3 || Jackson (1–0) || Carrasco (0–1) || || 2:46 || 9,853 || 2–0 || +½ || box
|- align="center" bgcolor="ffbbbb"
| 3 || April 3 || @ Indians || 7–1 || Masterson (1–0) || Danks (0–1) || || 2:27 || 8,726 || 2–1 || −½ || box
|- align="center" bgcolor="ffbbbb"
| 4 || April 5 || @ Royals || 7–6 (12) || Jeffress (1–0) || Peña (0–1) || || 3:32 || 12,641 || 2–2 || −1½ || box
|- align="center" bgcolor="bbffbb"
| 5 || April 6 || @ Royals || 10–7 (12) || Sale (1–0) || O'Sullivan (0–1) || || 3:41 || 13,360 || 3–2 || −½ || box
|- align="center" bgcolor="bbffbb"
| 6 || April 7 || Rays || 5–1 || Jackson (2–0) || Price (0–2) || || 2:30 || 38,579 || 4–2 || 0 || box
|- align="center" bgcolor="ffbbbb"
| 7 || April 8 || Rays || 9–7 || Russell (1–0) || Thornton (0–1) || Farnsworth (1) || 3:13 || 20,199 || 4–3 || −1 || box 
|- align="center" bgcolor="bbffbb"
| 8 || April 9 || Rays || 4–2 || Humber (1–0) || Davis (0–2) || Sale (1) || 2:43 || 26,378 || 5–3 || −1 || box
|- align="center" bgcolor="bbffbb"
| 9 || April 10 || Rays || 6–1 || Floyd (1–0) || Niemann (0–2) || || 2:08 || 23,436 || 6–3 || −1 || box
|- align="center" bgcolor="ffbbbb"
| 10 || April 11 || Athletics || 2–1 (10) || Ross (1–0) || Crain (0–1) || Fuentes (4) || 2:37 || 20,057 || 6–4 || −2 || box
|- align="center" bgcolor="bbffbb"
| 11 || April 12 || Athletics || 6–5 (10) || Sale (2–0) || Cramer (0–1) || || 3:32 || 18,020 || 7–4 || −1 || box
|- align="center" bgcolor="ffbbbb"
| 12 || April 13 || Athletics || 7–4 (10) || Balfour (1–1) || Thornton (0–2) || Fuentes (5) || 3:23 || 16,523 || 7–5 || −1 || box
|- align="center" bgcolor="ffbbbb"
| 13 || April 15 || Angels || 4–3 || Weaver (4–0) || Humber (1–1) || Walden (2) || 2:53 || 20,103 || 7–6 || −2 ||  box
|- align="center" bgcolor="ffbbbb"
| 14 || April 16 || Angels || 7–2 || Chatwood (1–1) || Floyd (1–1) || || 2:35 || 21,250 || 7–7 || −3 ||  box
|- align="center" bgcolor="ffbbbb"
| 15 || April 17 || Angels || 4–2 || Haren (4–0) || Buehrle (1–1) || Walden (3) || 2:40 || 23,458 || 7–8 || −4 || box 
|- align="center" bgcolor="ffbbbb"
| 16 || April 18 || @ Rays || 5–0 || Price (2–2) || Jackson (2–1) || || 2:26 || 12,016 || 7–9 || −5 || box 
|- align="center" bgcolor="ffbbbb"
| 17 || April 19 || @ Rays || 2–1 || Shields (1–1) || Danks (0–2) || || 2:12 || 13,731 || 7–10 || −6 || box 
|- align="center" bgcolor="ffbbbb"
| 18 || April 20 || @ Rays || 4–1 || Davis (2–2) || Humber (1–2) || Farnsworth (4) || 2:30 || 13,214 || 7–11 || −6 || box 
|- align="center" bgcolor="bbffbb"
| 19 || April 21 || @ Rays || 9–2 || Floyd (2–1) || Niemann (0–3) || || 2:58 || 16,751 || 8–11 || −5 || box 
|- align="center" bgcolor="ffbbbb"
| 20 || April 22 || @ Tigers || 9–3 || Verlander (2–2) || Buehrle (1–2) || || 2:30 || 23,537 || 8–12 || −6 || box
|- align="center" bgcolor="ffbbbb"
| 21 || April 23 || @ Tigers || 9–0 || Penny (1–2) || Jackson (2–2) || || 3:01 || 35,227 || 8–13 || −7 || box
|- align="center" bgcolor="ffbbbb"
| 22 || April 24 || @ Tigers || 3–0 || Scherzer (4–0) || Danks (0–3) || Valverde (5) || 2:19 || 17,784 || 8–14 || −7 || box
|- align="center" bgcolor="bbffbb"
| 23 || April 25 || @ Yankees || 2–0 || Humber (2–2) || Burnett (3–1) || Santos (1) || 2:41 || 40,506 || 9–14 || −6 || box
|- align="center" bgcolor="bbffbb"
| 24 || April 26 || @ Yankees || 3–2 || Floyd (3–1) || Soriano (1–1) || Santos (2) || 2:54 || 40,785 || 10–14 || −5 || box
|- align="center" bgcolor="ffbbbb"
| 25 || April 27 || @ Yankees || 3–1 || Colón (2–1) || Buehrle (1–3) || Rivera (8) || 2:11 || 40,586 || 10–15 || −6 || box
|- align="center" bgcolor="ffbbbb"
| 26 || April 28 || @ Yankees || 12–3 || Sabathia (2–1) || Jackson (2–3) || || 3:06 || 40,081 || 10–16 || −7 || box
|- align="center" bgcolor="ffbbbb"
| 27 || April 29 || Orioles || 10–4 || Arrieta (3–1) || Danks (0–4) || || 2:58 || 21,816 || 10–17 || −8 || box
|- align="center" bgcolor="ffbbbb"
| 28 || April 30 || Orioles || 6–2 || Tillman (1–2) || Humber (2–3) || || 2:46 || 26,104 || 10–18 || −9 || box
|-

|- align="center" bgcolor="ffbbbb"
| 29 || May 1 || Orioles || 6–4 || Britton (5–1) || Floyd (3–2) || Gregg (5) || 3:03 || 22,029 || 10–19 || −10 || box
|- align="center" bgcolor="bbffbb"
| 30 || May 2 || Orioles || 6–2 || Buehrle (2–3) || Guthrie (1–4) || Santos (3) || 2:43 || 18,007 || 11–19 || −9½ || box
|- align="center" bgcolor="ffbbbb"
| 31 || May 3 || Twins || 1–0 || Liriano (2–4) || Jackson (2–4) || || 2:09 || 20,901 || 11–20 || −10½ || box
|- align="center" bgcolor="ffbbbb"
| 32 || May 4 || Twins || 3–2 || Blackburn (2–4) || Danks (0–5) || Capps (5) || 2:30 || 18,028 || 11–21 || −10½ || box
|- align="center" bgcolor="ffbbbb"
| 33 || May 6 || @ Mariners || 3–2 || Hernández (4–2) || Thornton (0–3) || || 2:27 || 31,912 || 11–22 || −11 || box
|- align="center" bgcolor="bbffbb"
| 34 || May 7 || @ Mariners || 6–0 || Floyd (4–2) || Fister (2–4) || || 2:38 || 26,288 || 12–22 || −11 || box
|- align="center" bgcolor="bbffbb"
| 35 || May 8 || @ Mariners || 5–2 (10) || Santos (1–0) || League (0–1) || || 3:09 || 26,074 || 13–22 || −10 || box
|- align="center" bgcolor="bbffbb"
| 36 || May 9 || @ Angels || 8–0 || Jackson (3–4) || Santana (1–4) || || 2:29 || 38,561 || 14–22 || −9½ || box
|- align="center" bgcolor="ffbbbb"
| 37 || May 10 || @ Angels || 6–2 || Piñeiro (2–0) || Danks (0–6) || || 2:32 || 40,128 || 14–23 || −10½ || box
|- align="center" bgcolor="bbffbb"
| 38 || May 11 || @ Angels || 6–4 (10) || Santos (2–0) || Jepsen (0–2) || Thornton (1) || 3:13 || 39,151 || 15–23 || −9½ || box
|- align="center" bgcolor="bbffbb"
| 39 || May 13 || @ Athletics || 4–3 || Humber (3–3) || McCarthy (1–4) || Santos (4) || 2:21 || 12,690 || 16–23 || −9 || box
|- align="center" bgcolor="ffbbbb"
| 40 || May 14 || @ Athletics || 6–2 || Ross (3–2) || Floyd (4–3) || || 2:49 || 17,291 || 16–24 || −9 || box
|- align="center" bgcolor="bbffbb"
| 41 || May 15 || @ Athletics || 4–3 || Buehrle (3–3) || Cahill (6–1) || Santos (5) || 2:32 || 19,018 || 17–24 || −9 || box
|- align="cen1er" bgcolor="ffbbbb"
| 42 || May 16 || Rangers || 4–0 || Lewis (4–4) || Jackson (3–5) || || 2:39 || 23,048 || 17–25 || −10 || box
|- align="center" bgcolor="bbffbb"
| 43 || May 17 || Rangers || 4–3 || Crain (1–1) || Eppley (1–1) || Santos (6) || 2:36 || 22,437 || 18–25 || −10 || box
|- align="center" bgcolor="bbffbb"
| 44 || May 18 || Indians || 1–0 || Peavy (1–0) || Masterson (5–2) ||  || 2:01 || 18,580 || 19–25 || −9 || box
|- align="center" bgcolor="bbffbb"
| 45 || May 19 || Indians || 8–2 || Floyd (5–3) || Carmona (3–4) || || 2:32 || 22,077 || 20–25 || −8 || box
|- align="center" bgcolor="ffbbbb"
| 46 || May 20 || Dodgers || 6–4 (10) || Jansen (1–0) || Santos (2–1) || MacDougal (1) || 3:17 || 24,121 || 20–26 || −10 || box
|- align="center" bgcolor="bbffbb"
| 47 || May 21 || Dodgers || 9–2 || Buehrle (4–3) || Garland (1–4) || || 2:33 || 25,519 || 21–26 || −9 || box
|- align="center" bgcolor="bbffbb"
| 48 || May 22 || Dodgers || 8–3 || Jackson (4–5) || Kuroda (5–4) || Thornton (2) || 3:20 || 25,081 || 22–26 || −9 || box
|- align="center" bgcolor="ffbbbb"
| 49 || May 23 || @ Rangers || 4–0 || Ogando (5–0) || Danks (0–7) || || 2:05 || 30,861 || 22–27 || −10 || box
|- align="center" bgcolor="bbffbb"
| 50 || May 24 || @ Rangers || 8–6 || Peña (1–1) || Tomko (0–1) || Santos (7) || 3:21 || 35,524 || 23–27 || −9 || box
|- align="center" bgcolor="ffbbbb"
| 51 || May 25 || @ Rangers || 2–1 || Wilson (5–3) || Floyd (5–4) || Feliz (10) || 2:39 || 32,382 || 23–28 || −9 || box
|- align="center" bgcolor="bbffbb"
| 52 || May 26 || @ Blue Jays || 3–1 || Crain (2–1) || Rzepczynski (2–1) || Santos (8) || 2:54 || 14,353 || 24–28 || −8½ || box
|- align="center" bgcolor="ffbbbb"
| 53 || May 27 || @ Blue Jays || 4–2 || Janssen (2–0) || Buehrle (4–4) || Rauch (6) || 2:52 || 16,668 || 24–29 || −8½ || box
|- align="center" bgcolor="ffbbbb"
| 54 || May 28 || @ Blue Jays || 9–8 (14) || Pérez (1–0) || Floyd (5–5) || || 4:17 || 22,659 || 24–30 || −9½ || box
|- align="center" bgcolor="ffbbbb"
| 55 || May 29 || @ Blue Jays || 13–4 || Romero (5–4) || Danks (0–8) || || 2:33 || 18,325 || 24–31 || −9½ || box
|- align="center" bgcolor="bbffbb"
| 56 || May 30 || @ Red Sox || 7–3 || Peavy (2–0) || Lester (7–2) || || 3:24 || 37,463 || 25–31 || −8½ ||  box
|- align="center" bgcolor="bbffbb"
| 57 || May 31 || @ Red Sox || 10–7 || Humber (4–3) || Aceves (2–1) || Sale (2) || 2:51 || 37,269 || 26–31 || −8½ || box
|-

|- align="center" bgcolor="bbffbb"
| 58 || June 1 || @ Red Sox || 7–4 || Floyd (6–5) || Albers (1–3) || Santos (9)  || 2:53 || 37,321 || 27–31 || −8 || box
|- align="center" bgcolor="bbffbb"
| 59 || June 3 || Tigers || 6–4 || Buehrle (5–4) || Oliver (0–1) || Santos (10) || 3:04 || 23,095 || 28–31 || −7 || box
|- align="center" bgcolor="ffbbbb"
| 60 || June 4 || Tigers || 4–2 || Verlander (6–3) || Crain (2–2) || Valverde (15) || 3:17 || 31,037 || 28–32 || −7 || box
|- align="center" bgcolor="ffbbbb"
| 61 || June 5 || Tigers || 7–3 || Penny (5–4) || Peavy (2–1) || || 3:25 || 25,149 || 28–33 || −7 || box
|- align="center" bgcolor="bbffbb"
| 62 || June 6 || Mariners || 3–1 || Danks (1–8) || Pineda (6–3) || Santos (11) || 2:23 || 23,847 || 29–33 || −6 || box
|- align="center" bgcolor="bbffbb"
| 63 || June 7 || Mariners || 5–1 || Humber (5–3) || Hernández (6–5) || || 2:25 || 21,337 || 30–33 || −6 || box
|- align="center" bgcolor="ffbbbb"
| 64 || June 8 || Mariners || 7–4 (10) || Laffey (1–1) || Santos (2–2) || League (17) || 3:06 || 21,517 || 30–34 || −6 || box
|- align="center" bgcolor="bbffbb"
| 65 || June 9 || Athletics || 9–4 || Buehrle (6–4) || Cahill (6–4) || || 2:51 || 22,170 || 31–34 || −5½ || box
|- align="center" bgcolor="ffbbbb"
| 66 || June 10 || Athletics || 7–5 || Balfour (4–1) || Santos (2–3) || Bailey (1) || 3:10 || 20,166 || 31–35 || −5½ || box
|- align="center" bgcolor="bbffbb"
| 67 || June 11 || Athletics || 3–2 || Danks (2–8) || Gonzalez (5–5) || Crain (1) || 3:01 || 24,391 || 32–35 || −4½ || box
|- align="center" bgcolor="bbffbb"
| 68 || June 12 || Athletics || 5–4 || Humber (6–3) || Moscoso (2–3) || Santos (12) || 2:51 || 22,144 || 33–35 || −3½ || box
|- align="center" bgcolor="bbbbbb"
| − || June 14 || @ Twins ||colspan=7| Postponed (rain), rescheduled for September 6 || −4 ||
|- align="center" bgcolor="ffbbbb"
| 69 || June 15 || @ Twins || 4–1 || Pavano (4–5) || Floyd (6–6) || || 2:06 || 37,437 || 33–36 || −4½ || box
|- align="center" bgcolor="ffbbbb"
| 70 || June 16 || @ Twins || 1–0 || Blackburn (6–4) || Buehrle (6–5) || Capps (9) || 2:09 || 39,484 || 33–37 || −5½ || box
|- align="center" bgcolor="ffbbbb"
| 71 || June 17 || @ D-Backs || 4–1 || Hudson (8–5) || Jackson (4–6) || || 2:37 || 26,053 || 33–38 || −5½ || box
|- align="center" bgcolor="bbffbb"
| 72 || June 18 || @ D-Backs || 6–2 || Danks (3–8) || Duke (1–2) || || 2:41 || 33,230 || 34–38 || −5½ || box
|- align="center" bgcolor="bbffbb"
| 73 || June 19 || @ D-Backs || 8–2 || Humber (7–3) || Collmenter (4–3) || || 2:38 || 39,538 || 35–38 || −5½ || box
|- align="center" bgcolor="ffbbbb"
| 74 || June 20 || Cubs || 6–3 || Zambrano (6–4) || Floyd (6–7) || Mármol (15) || 2:45 || 36,005 || 35–39 || −5½ || box
|- align="center" bgcolor="bbffbb"
| 75 || June 21 || Cubs || 3–2 || Crain (3–2) || Samardzija (5–3) || Santos (13) || 2:31 || 35,155 || 36–39 || −4½ || box
|- align="center" bgcolor="bbffbb"
| 76 || June 22 || Cubs || 4–3 || Peavy (3–1) || Davis (1–6) || Santos (14) || 3:01 || 35,403 || 37–39 || −4½ || box
|- align="center" bgcolor="ffbbbb"
| 77 || June 24 || Nationals || 9–5 (14) || Balester (1–0) || Thornton (0–4) || || 4:58 || 23,856 || 37–40 || −4½ || box
|- align="center" bgcolor="bbffbb"
| 78 || June 25 || Nationals || 3–0 || Peavy (4–1) || Gorzelanny (2–6) || Santos (15) || 2:54 || 23,008 || 38–40 || −3½ || box
|- align="center" bgcolor="ffbbbb"
| 79 || June 26 || Nationals || 2–1 || Hernández (5–8) || Humber (7–4) || Storen (19) || 2:56 || 24,057 || 38–41 || −4½ || box
|- align="center" bgcolor="ffbbbb"
| 80 || June 28 || @ Rockies || 3–2 (13) || Brothers (1–0) || Ohman (0–1) || || 3:47 || 40,175 || 38–42 || −5 || box
|- align="center" bgcolor="bbffbb"
| 81 || June 29 || @ Rockies || 3–2 || Bruney (1–0) || Street (0–2) || Santos (16) || 2:24 || 35,973 || 39–42 || −4 || box
|- align="center" bgcolor="bbffbb"
| 82 || June 30 || @ Rockies || 6–4 (10) || Crain (4–2) || Mortensen (2–4) || Santos (17) || 3:41 || 38,084 || 40–42 || −4 || box
|-

|- align="center" bgcolor="bbffbb"
| 83 || July 1 || @ Cubs || 6–4 || Jackson (5–6) || Wells (1–3) || Santos (18) || 2:43 || 41,486 || 41–42 || −3½ || box
|- align="center" bgcolor="bbffbb"
| 84 || July 2 || @ Cubs || 1–0 || Humber (8–4) || Garza (4–7) || Thornton (3) || 2:37 || 42,165 || 42–42 || −3½ || box
|- align="center" bgcolor="ffbbbb"
| 85 || July 3 || @ Cubs || 3–1 || López (1–2) || Floyd (6–8) || Mármol (17) || 2:23 || 42,311 || 42–43 || −3½ || box
|- align="center" bgcolor="bbffbb"
| 86 || July 4 || Royals || 5–4 || Santos (3–3) || Crow (2–2) || || 2:36 || 31,077 || 43–43 || −3½ || box 
|- align="center" bgcolor="ffbbbb"
| 87 || July 5 || Royals || 5–3 || Paulino (1–6) || Peavy (4–2) || Soria (14) || 2:59 || 20,695 || 43–44 || −3½ || box
|- align="center" bgcolor="ffbbbb"
| 88 || July 6 || Royals || 4–1 || Chen (5–2) || Jackson (5–7) || Soria (15) || 2:40 || 27,233 || 43–45 || −4½ || box
|- align="center" bgcolor="ffbbbb"
| 89 || July 7 || Twins || 6–2 || Pavano (6–6) || Humber (8–5) || || 2:35 || 26,395 || 43–46 || −5½ || box
|- align="center" bgcolor="ffbbbb"
| 90 || July 8 || Twins || 8–5 || Blackburn (7–6) || Floyd (6–9) || Capps (14) || 3:22 || 27,737 || 43–47 || −5½ || box
|- align="center" bgcolor="bbffbb"
| 91 || July 9 || Twins || 4–3 || Crain (5–2) || Mijares (0–1) || || 2:36 || 30,055 || 44–47 || −4½ || box
|- align="center" bgcolor="ffbbbb"
| 92 || July 10 || Twins || 6–3 || Swarzak (2–2) || Peavy (4–3) || Capps (15) || 3:00 || 30,042 || 44–48 || −5 || box
|- align="center" bgcolor="87ceeb"
| colspan="12" bgcolor="#bbcaff" | All–Star Break: NL defeats AL 5–1 at Chase Field
|- align="center" bgcolor="bbffbb"
| 93 || July 15 || @ Tigers || 8–2 || Floyd (7–9) || Verlander (12–5) || || 3:06 || 43,593 || 45–48 || −5 || box
|- align="center" bgcolor="bbffbb"
| 94 || July 16 || @ Tigers || 5–0 || Jackson (6–7) || Scherzer (10–5) || || 2:46 || 40,984 || 46–48 || −4 || box
|- align="center" bgcolor="ffbbbb"
| 95 || July 17 || @ Tigers || 4–3 || Penny (7–6) || Humber (8–6) || Valverde (25) || 2:40 || 37,049 || 46–49 || −4 || box
|- align="cen1er" bgcolor="bbffbb"
| 96 || July 18 || @ Royals || 5–2 || Buehrle (7–5) || Davies (1–9) || || 2:37 || 17,190 || 47–49 || −4½ || box
|- align="center" bgcolor="ffbbbb"
| 97 || July 19 || @ Royals || 4–2 || Duffy (2–4) || Peavy (4–4) || Soria (17) || 2:28 || 20,126 || 47–50 || −5½ || box
|- align="center" bgcolor="ffbbbb"
| 98 || July 20 || @ Royals || 2–1 (11) || Crow (3–2) || Sale (2–1) || || 2:47 || 13,831 || 47–51 || −5½ || box
|- align="center" bgcolor="bbffbb"
| 99 || July 22 || @ Indians || 3–0 || Floyd (8–9) || Carrasco (8–8) || Santos (19) || 2:45 || 27,477 || 48–51 || −5 || box
|- align="center" bgcolor="bbbbbb"
| – || July 23 || @ Indians ||colspan=7| Postponed (rain), rescheduled for September 20 || –5½ ||
|- align="center" bgcolor="bbffbb"
| 100 || July 24 || @ Indians || 4–2 || Jackson (7–7) || Masterson (8–7) || Santos (20) || 2:54 || 20,252 || 49–51 || −4½ || box
|- align="center" bgcolor="bbffbb"
| 101 || July 25 || Tigers || 6–3 || Buehrle (8–5) || Below (0–1) || || 3:00 || 37,110 || 50–51 || −3½ || box
|- align="center" bgcolor="ffbbbb"
| 102 || July 26 || Tigers || 5–4 || Verlander (14–5) || Ohman (0–2) || Valverde (27) || 3:04 || 28,093 || 50–52 || −4½ || box
|- align="center" bgcolor="bbffbb"
| 103 || July 27 || Tigers || 2–1 || Danks (4–8) || Scherzer (11–6) || Santos (21) || 2:50 || 26,978 || 51–52 || −3½ || box
|- align="center" bgcolor="bbffbb"
| 104 || July 29 || Red Sox || 3–1 || Floyd (9–9) || Wakefield (6–4) || Santos (22) || 2:10 || 27,513 || 52–52 || −3 || box
|- align="center" bgcolor="ffbbbb"
| 105 || July 30 || Red Sox || 10–2 || Lester (11–4) || Humber (8–7) || || 3:00 || 33,919 || 52–53 || −3 || box
|- align="center" bgcolor="ffbbbb"
| 106 || July 31 || Red Sox || 5–3 || Aceves (7–1) || Crain (5–3) || Papelbon (24) || 3:31 || 28,278 || 52–54 || −4 || box
|-

|- align="center" bgcolor="ffbbbb"
| 107 || August 1 || Yankees || 3–2 || Sabathia (16–5) || Peavy (4–5) || Rivera (28) || 2:30 || 24,142 || 52–55 || −4½ || box
|- align="center" bgcolor="ffbbbb"
| 108 || August 2 || Yankees || 6–0 (7) || Hughes (2–3) || Danks (4–9) || || 1:59 || 21,661 || 52–56 || −5½ || box
|- align="center" bgcolor="ffbbbb"
| 109 || August 3 || Yankees || 18–7 || Wade (2–0) || Floyd (9–10) || || 3:13 || 23,873 || 52–57 || −6½ || box
|- align="center" bgcolor="ffbbbb"
| 110 || August 4 || Yankees || 7–2 || Nova (10–4) || Humber (8–8) || || 2:44 || 28,088 || 52–58 || −6½ || box
|- align="center" bgcolor="bbffbb"
| 111 || August 5 || @ Twins || 5–3 || Buehrle (9–5) || Blackburn (7–9) || Sale (3) || 2:29 || 41,364 || 53–58 || −6½ || box
|- align="center" bgcolor="bbffbb"
| 112 || August 6 || @ Twins || 6–1 || Stewart (1–1) || Pavano (6–9) || || 2:44 || 41,030 || 54–58 || −6½ || box
|- align="center" bgcolor="bbffbb"
| 113 || August 7 || @ Twins || 7–0 || Peavy (5–5) || Duensing (8–10) || || 2:30 || 39,353 || 55–58 || −5½ || box
|- align="center" bgcolor="bbffbb"
| 114 || August 8 || @ Orioles || 7–6 || Crain (6–3) || Johnson (5–4) || Santos (23) || 2:38 || 17,498 || 56–58 || −5 || box
|- align="center" bgcolor="bbffbb"
| 115 || August 9 || @ Orioles || 4–3 || Floyd (10–10) || Reyes (5–9) || Santos (24) || 2:42 || 14,177 || 57–58 || −4 || box
|- align="center" bgcolor="ffbbbb"
| 116 || August 10 || @ Orioles || 6–4 (10) || Gonzalez (2–2) || Frasor (2–2) || || 3:00 || 18,747 || 57–59 || −4 || box
|- align="center" bgcolor="bbffbb"
| 117 || August 11 || @ Orioles || 6–3 || Buehrle (10–5) || Tillman (3–5) || Santos (25) || 2:32 || 21,040 || 58–59 || −4 || box
|- align="center" bgcolor="ffbbbb"
| 118 || August 12 || Royals || 5–1 || Chen (7–5) || Stewart (1–2) || Holland (2) || 2:55 || 23,130 || 58–60 || −5 || box
|- align="center" bgcolor="bbffbb"
| 119 || August 13 || Royals || 5–4 || Crain (7–3) || Hochevar (8–9) || Sale (4) || 2:58 || 24,854 || 59–60 || −5 || box
|- align="center" bgcolor="bbffbb"
| 120 || August 14 || Royals || 6–2 || Danks (5–9) || Francis (4–13) || || 2:47 || 25,517 || 60–60 || −4 || box
|- align="cen1er" bgcolor="bbffbb"
| 121 || August 16 || Indians || 8–7 (14) || Frasor (3–2) || Durbin (2–2) || || 5:21 || 24,695 || 61–60 || −3½ || box
|- align="center" bgcolor="ffbbbb"
| 122 || August 17 || Indians || 4–1 || Carmona (6–12) || Buehrle (10–6) || Perez (26) || 2:46 || 25,029 || 61–61 || −3½ || box
|- align="center" bgcolor="ffbbbb"
| 123 || August 18 || Indians || 4–2 || Masterson (10–7) || Ohman (0–3) || Perez (27) || 3:05 || 27,079 || 61–62 || −4 || box
|- align="center" bgcolor="ffbbbb"
| 124 || August 19 || Rangers || 7–4 || Tateyama (2–0) || Peavy (5–6) || Feliz (25) || 2:47 || 28,308 || 61–63 || −5 || box
|- align="center" bgcolor="bbffbb"
| 125 || August 20 || Rangers || 3–2 || Crain (8–3) || Uehara (1–3) || Santos (26) || 2:33 || 30,021 || 62–63 || −5 || box
|- align="center" bgcolor="bbffbb"
| 126 || August 21 || Rangers || 10–0 || Floyd (11–10) || Holland (11–5) || || 3:04 || 25,033 || 63–63 || −5 || box
|- align="center" bgcolor="ffbbbb"
| 127 || August 23 || @ Angels || 5–4 || Walden (4–3) || Frasor (3–3) || || 2:48 || 37,728 || 63–64 || −6½ || box
|- align="center" bgcolor="ffbbbb"
| 128 || August 24 || @ Angels || 8–0 || Weaver (15–6) || Stewart (1–3) || || 2:28 || 36,610 || 63–65 || −6½ || box
|- align="center" bgcolor="bbffbb"
| 129 || August 26 || @ Mariners || 4–2 || Peavy (6–6) || Furbush (3–6) || Sale (5) || 3:06 || 28,621 || 64–65 || −7 || box
|- align="center" bgcolor="bbffbb"
| 130 || August 27 || @ Mariners || 3–0 || Danks (6–9) || Pineda (9–8) || || 2:09 || 30,522 || 65–65 || −7 || box 
|- align="center" bgcolor="bbffbb"
| 131 || August 28 || @ Mariners || 9–3 || Floyd (12–10) || Vargas (7–12) || || 2:45 || 25,630 || 66–65 || −6 || box
|- align="center" bgcolor="bbffbb"
| 132 || August 29 || Twins || 3–0 || Buehrle (11–6) || Slowey (0–3) || Santos (27) || 2:04 || 24,120 || 67–65 || −5 || box
|- align="center" bgcolor="bbffbb"
| 133 || August 30 || Twins || 8–6 || Ohman (1–3) || Swarzak (3–5) || Santos (28) || 2:57 || 21,632 || 68–65 || −5 || box
|- align="center" bgcolor="ffbbbb"
| 134 || August 31 || Twins || 7–6 || Diamond (1–2) || Peavy (6–7) || Nathan (12) || 2:42 || 20,346 || 68–66 || −6 || box
|-

|- align="center" bgcolor="ffbbbb"
| 135 || September 2 || @ Tigers || 8–1 || Verlander (21–5) || Danks (6–10) || || 2:39 || 42,352 || 68–67 || −6½ || box
|- align="center" bgcolor="ffbbbb"
| 136 || September 3 || @ Tigers || 9–8 || Marte (1–0) || Santos (3–4) || || 3:10 || 40,635 || 68–68 || −7½ || box 
|- align="center" bgcolor="ffbbbb"
| 137 || September 4 || @ Tigers || 18–2 || Scherzer (14–8) || Buehrle (11–7) || || 3:21 || 42,671 || 68–69 || −8½ || box 
|- align="center" bgcolor="bbffbb"
| 138 || September 5 || @ Twins || 2–1 || Humber (9–8) || Swarzak (3–6) || Sale (6) || 2:27 || 40,252 || 69–69 || −8½ || box
|- align="center" bgcolor="bbffbb"
| 139 || September 5 || @ Twins || 4–0 || Stewart (2–3) || Diamond (1–3) || || 2:26 || 39,849 || 70–69 || −8 || box
|- align="center" bgcolor="bbffbb"
| 140 || September 6 || @ Twins || 3–0 || Peavy (7–7) || Hendriks (0–1) || Santos (29) || 2:29 || 36,959 || 71–69 || −8 || box
|- align="center" bgcolor="ffbbbb"
| 141 || September 7 || @ Twins || 5–4 || Pavano (8–11) || Danks (6–11) || Nathan (13) || 2:44 || 38,359 || 71–70 || −9 || box
|- align="center" bgcolor="bbffbb"
| 142 || September 8 || Indians || 8–1 || Thornton (1–4) || Huff (2–4) || || 3:18 || 22,063 || 72–70 || −8½ || box
|- align="center" bgcolor="ffbbbb"
| 143 || September 9 || Indians || 8–4 || Gómez (3–2) || Buehrle (11–8) || || 2:58 || 26,711 || 72–71 || −9½ || box
|- align="center" bgcolor="bbffbb"
| 144 || September 10 || Indians || 7–3 (10) || Santos (4–4) || Perez (3–7) || || 3:27 || 26,719 || 73–71 || −9½ || box
|- align="center" bgcolor="ffbbbb"
| 145 || September 11 || Indians || 7–3 || Jiménez (9–11) || Stewart (2–4) || || 3:01 || 22,319 || 73–72 || −10½ || box
|- align="center" bgcolor="ffbbbb"
| 146 || September 12 || Tigers || 14–4 || Porcello (13–8) || Danks (6–12) || || 3:04 || 22,750 || 73–73 || −11½ || box
|- align="center" bgcolor="ffbbbb"
| 147 || September 13 || Tigers || 5–0 || Verlander (23–5) || Floyd (12–11) || || 3:23 || 25,015 || 73–74 || −12½ || box
|- align="center" bgcolor="ffbbbb"
| 148 || September 14 || Tigers || 6–5 (10) || Coke (3–9) || Santos (4–5) || Valverde (44) || 3:05 || 19,010 || 73–75 || −13½ || box
|- align="center" bgcolor="ffbbbb"
| 149 || September 15 || @ Royals || 7–2 || Francis (6–16) || Buehrle (11–9) || || 2:38 || 17,737 || 73–76 || −13½ || box
|- align="cen1er" bgcolor="ffbbbb"
| 150 || September 16 || @ Royals || 7–6 || Holland (5–1) || Thornton (1–5) || || 3:13 || 24,918 || 73–77 || −14½ || box
|- align="center" bgcolor="ffbbbb"
| 151 || September 17 || @ Royals || 10–3 || Teaford (2–0) || Stewart (2–5) || Adcock (1) || 2:47 || 31,264 || 73–78 || −14½ || box
|- align="center" bgcolor="bbffbb"
| 152 || September 18 || @ Royals || 10–5 || Danks (7–12) || Chen (11–8) || || 3:07 || 29,480 || 74–78 || −14½ || box
|- align="center" bgcolor="ffbbbb"
| 153 || September 20 || @ Indians || 4–3 || Carmona (7–15) || Floyd (12–12) || Perez (35) || 2:19 || 28,603 || 74–79 || −14 || box
|- align="center" bgcolor="bbffbb"
| 154 || September 20 || @ Indians || 5–4 || Thornton (2–5) || Putnam (0–1) || Sale (7) || 3:15 || 19,582 || 75–79 || −14 || box
|- align="center" bgcolor="bbffbb"
| 155 || September 21 || @ Indians || 8–4 || Buehrle (12–9) || Jiménez (10–12) || || 2:52 || 12,400 || 76–79 || −14 || box
|- align="center" bgcolor="ffbbbb"
| 156 || September 22 || @ Indians || 11–2 || Gómez (5–2) || Humber (9–9)  || || 2:36 || 21,487 || 76–80 || −14 || box
|- align="center" bgcolor="ffbbbb"
| 157 || September 23 || Royals || 11–1 || Chen (12–8) || Stewart (2–6) || || 2:22 || 21,744 || 76–81 || −15 || box
|- align="center" bgcolor="bbffbb"
| 158 || September 24 || Royals || 6–3 || Danks (8–12) || Teaford (2–1) || || 2:24 || 26,249 || 77–81 || −14 || box
|- align="center" bgcolor="ffbbbb"
| 159 || September 25 || Royals || 2–1 || Mendoza (2–0) || Floyd (12–13) || Holland (4) || 2:29 || 22,018 || 77–82 || −15 || box 
|- align="center" bgcolor="bbffbb"
| 160 || September 26 || Blue Jays || 4–3 || Axelrod (1–0) || McGowan (0–2) || Santos (30) || 2:49 || 21,320 || 78–82 || −15 || box
|- align="center" bgcolor="bbffbb"
| 161 || September 27 || Blue Jays || 2–1 || Buehrle (13–9) || Álvarez (1–3) || Sale (8) || 2:15 || 23,934 || 79–82 || −15 || box
|- align="center" bgcolor="ffbbbb"
| 162 || September 28 || Blue Jays || 3–2 || Camp (6–3) || Sale (2–2) || Francisco (17) || 2:48 || 20,524 || 79–83 || −16 || box
|-

Player stats

Batting
Note: G = Games played; AB = At bats; R = Runs scored; H = Hits; 2B = Doubles; 3B = Triples; HR = Home runs; RBI = Runs batted in; BB = Base on balls; SO = Strikeouts; AVG = Batting average; SB = Stolen bases

Pitching
Note: W = Wins; L = Losses; ERA = Earned run average; G = Games pitched; GS = Games started; SV = Saves; IP = Innings pitched; H = Hits allowed; R = Runs allowed; ER = Earned runs allowed; HR = Home runs allowed; BB = Walks allowed; K = Strikeouts; O-AVG = Opponent batting average

Farm system

LEAGUE CHAMPIONS: Great Falls

References

External links
2011 Chicago White Sox at Baseball Reference

Chicago White Sox seasons
Chicago White Sox
White